Michael J. Saylor (born February 4, 1965) is an American entrepreneur and business executive. He is the executive chairman and a co-founder of MicroStrategy, a company that provides business intelligence, mobile software, and cloud-based services. Saylor served as MicroStrategy's chief executive officer from 1989 to 2022. He authored the 2012 book The Mobile Wave: How Mobile Intelligence Will Change Everything. He is also the sole trustee of Saylor Academy, a provider of free online education. As of 2016, Saylor had been granted 31 patents and had 9 additional applications under review.

Life
Saylor was born in Lincoln, Nebraska on February 4, 1965, and spent his early years on various Air Force bases around the world, as his father was an Air Force chief master sergeant. When Saylor was 11, the family settled in Fairborn, Ohio, near the Wright-Patterson Air Force Base.

In 1983, Saylor enrolled at the Massachusetts Institute of Technology (MIT) on an Air Force ROTC scholarship. He joined the Theta Delta Chi fraternity, through which he met the future co-founder of MicroStrategy, Sanju Bansal. He graduated from MIT in 1987, with a double major in aeronautics and astronautics; and science, technology, and society.

A medical condition prevented him from becoming a pilot, and instead, he got a job with a consulting firm, The Federal Group, Inc. in 1987, where he focused on computer simulation modeling for a software integration company. In 1988, Saylor became an internal consultant at DuPont, where he developed computer models to help the company anticipate change in its key markets. The simulations predicted that there would be a recession in many of DuPont's major markets in 1990.

MicroStrategy

Using the funds from DuPont, Saylor founded MicroStrategy with Sanju Bansal, his MIT fraternity brother. The company began developing software for data mining, then focused on software for business intelligence. In 1992, MicroStrategy won a $10 million contract with McDonald's to develop applications to analyze the efficiency of its promotions. The contract with McDonald's led Saylor to realize that his company could create business intelligence software that would allow companies to use their own data for insights into their businesses.

Saylor took the company public in June 1998, with an initial stock offering of 4 million shares priced at $12 each. The stock price doubled on the first day of trading. He owns over 39,521 units of the company worth over $14,482,075. By early 2000, Saylor's net worth reached $7 billion, and the Washingtonian reported that he was the wealthiest man in the Washington D.C. area.

In 1996, Saylor was named KPMG Washington High-Tech Entrepreneur of the Year. In 1997, Ernst & Young named Saylor its Software Entrepreneur of the Year, and the following year, Red Herring Magazine recognized him as one of its Top 10 Entrepreneurs for 1998. Saylor was also featured by the MIT Technology Review as an "Innovator Under 35" in 1999.

On August 8, 2022, Saylor resigned as CEO and remained executive chairman of MicroStrategy. Phong Le, the company's president, succeeded him as CEO. Saylor said in a press release, "As Executive Chairman I will be able to focus more on our bitcoin acquisition strategy and related bitcoin advocacy initiatives, while Phong will be empowered as CEO to manage overall corporate operations."

In December 2022, Saylor bought and immediately sold Bitcoin for "tax purposes."

SEC investigation
In March 2000, the U.S. Securities and Exchange Commission (SEC) brought charges against Saylor and two other MicroStrategy executives for the company's inaccurate reporting of financial results for the preceding two years. In December 2000, Saylor settled with the SEC without admitting wrongdoing by paying $350,000 in penalties and a personal disgorgement of $8.3 million. As a result of the restatement of results, the company's stock declined in value and Saylor's net worth fell by $6 billion.

COVID-19 response criticism

In a 3,000-word memo to all MicroStrategy employees on March 16, 2020, entitled "My Thoughts on COVID-19," Saylor criticized countermeasures then being recommended against the disease, saying that it is "soul-stealing and debillitating [sic] to embrace the notion of social distancing & economic hibernation" and predicting that in the worst-case scenario, global life expectancy would only "click down by a few weeks." Saylor also refused to close MicroStrategy's offices unless he was legally required to do so. The full content of the memo appeared on Reddit for only a few minutes and was reposted in the Washington Business Journal.

Bitcoin investment

On MicroStrategy's quarterly earnings conference call in July 2020, Saylor announced his intention for MicroStrategy to explore purchasing Bitcoin, gold, or other alternative assets instead of holding cash. The following month, MicroStrategy used $250 million from its cash stockpile to purchase 21,454 Bitcoin.

MicroStrategy later added $175 million of Bitcoin to its holdings in September 2020 and another $50 million in early December 2020. On December 11, 2020, MicroStrategy announced that it had sold $650 million in convertible senior notes, taking on debt to increase its Bitcoin holdings to over $1 billion worth. On December 21, 2020, MicroStrategy announced their total holdings include 70,470 bitcoins purchased for $1.125 billion at an average price of $15,964 per bitcoin. As of February 24, 2021 holdings include 90,531 bitcoins acquired for $2.171 billion at an average price of $23,985 per bitcoin. Saylor, who controls 70% of MicroStrategy's shares, dismissed concerns by observers that the move is turning MicroStrategy into a Bitcoin investment firm or exchange-traded fund (ETF).

In October 2020, Saylor disclosed he personally held 17,732 bitcoin at an average purchase price of $9,882. As of October 2021, he had not sold any bitcoin.

Between October 1 and November 29, 2021, MicroStrategy bought 7,002 bitcoins for about $414.4 million in cash at an average purchase price of $59,187, bringing its total holdings to 121,044 bitcoins.

In August 2022, following a $917 million impairment in the value of MicroStrategy's bitcoin investment, Saylor resigned as CEO, remaining as executive chairman.

District of Columbia tax fraud lawsuit
On August 31, 2022, the Attorney General for the District of Columbia sued Saylor for tax fraud, accusing him of illegally avoiding more than $25 million in D.C. taxes by pretending to be a resident of other jurisdictions. MicroStrategy was accused of collaborating with Saylor to facilitate his tax evasion by misreporting his residential address to local and federal tax authorities and failing to withhold D.C. taxes. Saylor issued a statement saying: "I respectfully disagree with the position of the District of Columbia and look forward to a fair resolution in the courts."

The Mobile Wave
In June 2012, Saylor released The Mobile Wave: How Mobile Intelligence Will Change Everything, published by Perseus Books, which discusses trends in mobile technology and their future impact on commerce, healthcare, education, and the developing world.  The book appeared on the New York Times Best Seller list, where it was ranked number seven in hardcover non-fiction books in August 2012, and was ranked number five in hardcover business books on the Wall Street Journal's Best-Sellers list in July 2012.

Saylor Academy
In 1999, Saylor established The Saylor Foundation (later named Saylor Academy), of which he is the sole trustee. Saylor.org was launched in 2008 as the free education initiative of The Saylor Foundation.

References

External links
 Michael Saylor official website

1965 births
Theft
Hacking (computer security)
Thieves
American technology chief executives
Living people
MIT School of Engineering alumni
People from Fairborn, Ohio
People from Lincoln, Nebraska
Businesspeople from Nebraska
Businesspeople from Ohio
20th-century American businesspeople
21st-century American businesspeople
American technology company founders
American technology writers
American philanthropists
People associated with cryptocurrency
People associated with Bitcoin